Wales is a town in Sanpete County, Utah, United States. The population was 219 at the 2000 census. The town is governed by a mayor and several council members. As of December 2008, Wales had no stores, gas stations nor stop lights. It does have a park, fire station, library and cemetery.

Description
The small mining town of Wales was named for the country of the immigrants that were sent there by Brigham Young in 1854 to mine the "rock that burns". A Native American named Tabison, a prominent Ute, had shown Young, then president of The Church of Jesus Christ of Latter-day Saints, a small sample. Young recognized it as coal and asked if any of his group knew how to mine the coal. Some Welsh immigrants including John Evans Rees and his cousin John Price, having experience with coal mining in the U.K., volunteered and were sent to the west side hills to set up mines.

The community's original name was Coal Bed, but was changed to Wales in 1857. There once was a railroad depot and it was an important and busy mining center. The mines and train were abandoned when more productive mines were discovered in Scofield. Many of the present residents are descendants of the original miners.

Wales lies on the west side of the Sanpete Valley, at the foot of the San Pitch Mountains.

Geography
According to the United States Census Bureau, the town has a total area of 0.3 square mile (0.8 km2), all land.

Demographics

As of the census of 2000, there were 219 people, 64 households, and 54 families residing in the town. The population density was 731.4 people per square mile (281.9/km2). There were 84 housing units at an average density of 280.5 per square mile (108.1/km2). The racial makeup of the town was 97.26% White, 0.46% Pacific Islander, 1.83% from other races, and 0.46% from two or more races. Hispanic or Latino of any race were 7.31% of the population.

There were 64 households, out of which 43.8% had children under the age of 18 living with them, 78.1% were married couples living together, 6.3% had a female householder with no husband present, and 14.1% were non-families. 12.5% of all households were made up of individuals, and 6.3% had someone living alone who was 65 years of age or older. The average household size was 3.42 and the average family size was 3.73.

In the town, the population was spread out, with 34.2% under the age of 18, 12.8% from 18 to 24, 21.9% from 25 to 44, 18.3% from 45 to 64, and 12.8% who were 65 years of age or older. The median age was 26 years. For every 100 females, there were 110.6 males. For every 100 females age 18 and over, there were 111.8 males.

The median income for a household in the town was $35,313, and the median income for a family was $38,750. Males had a median income of $28,125 versus $16,250 for females. The per capita income for the town was $9,885. About 3.7% of families and 6.0% of the population were below the poverty line, including 8.8% of those under the age of eighteen and 19.0% of those 65 or over.

See also

  List of municipalities in Utah

References

External links

 

Towns in Sanpete County, Utah
Towns in Utah
Populated places established in 1859
Welsh-American history
1859 establishments in Utah Territory